North Malabar  refers to the geographic area of southwest India covering the state of Kerala's present day Kasaragod, Kannur, and Wayanad districts, and the taluks of Vatakara, Koyilandy in the Kozhikode District of Kerala and the entire Mahé Sub-Division of the Union Territory of Puducherry. Traditionally North Malabar is defined as the northern portion of erstwhile Malabar District which lies between Chandragiri River and Korapuzha River. The region between Netravathi River and Chandragiri River, which included the portions between Mangalore and Kasaragod, are also often included in the term North Malabar, as the Kumbla dynasty in the southernmost region of Tulu Nadu (between Mangalore and Kasaragod), had a mixed lineage of Malayali Nairs and Tuluva Brahmins.

The North Malabar region is bounded by Dakshina Kannada (Mangalore) to north, the hilly regions of Kodagu and Mysore Plateau to east, South Malabar (Korapuzha) to south, and Arabian Sea to west. The greater part of North Malabar (except Mahé) remained as one of the two administrative divisions of the Malabar District (an administrative district of British India under the Madras Presidency) until 1947 and later became part of India's Madras State until 1956. Mahé remained under French jurisdiction until 13June 1954. On 1November 1956, the state of Kerala was formed by the States Reorganisation Act, which merged the Malabar District with Travancore-Cochin apart from the four southern taluks, which were merged with Tamil Nadu, and the Kasaragod taluk of South Kanara District. During British rule, North Malabar's chief importance laid in producing Thalassery pepper and Coconuts.

North Malabar begins at Korapuzha in the south and ends at Manjeshwaram in the north of Kerala and traditionally comprises the erstwhile princely principalities and chiefdoms of Kolathu Nadu, Kingdom of Kottayam, Kadathanadu and southern part of Tulu Nadu. Wayanad, which forms a continuation of Mysore Plateau, was the only Plateau in North Malabar as well as Kerala. Indian Naval Academy at Ezhimala is the Asia's largest, and the world's third-largest, naval academy. Muzhappilangad beach is the longest Drive-In Beach in Asia and is featured among the top 6 best beaches for driving in the world in BBC article for Autos. North Malabar is home to several forts which include Arikady fort, Bekal Fort, Chandragiri Fort,  Hosdurg Fort, St. Angelo Fort, and Tellicherry Fort. Bekal Fort is the largest fort in Kerala.

Etymology
Until the arrival of British, the term Malabar was used in foreign trade circles as a general name for Kerala. Earlier, the term Malabar had also been used to denote Tulu Nadu and Kanyakumari which lie contiguous to Kerala in the southwestern coast of India, in addition to the modern state of Kerala. The people of Malabar were known as Malabars. Still the term Malabar is often used to denote the entire southwestern coast of India. From the time of Cosmas Indicopleustes (6th century CE) itself, the Arab sailors used to call Kerala as Male. The first element of the name, however, is attested already in the Topography written by Cosmas Indicopleustes. This mentions a pepper emporium called Male, which clearly gave its name to Malabar ('the country of Male'). The name Male is thought to come from the Malayalam word Mala ('hill'). Al-Biruni (AD 973 - 1048) must have been the first writer to call this state Malabar.  Authors such as Ibn Khordadbeh and Al-Baladhuri mention Malabar ports in their works. The Arab writers had called this place Malibar, Manibar, Mulibar, and Munibar. Malabar is reminiscent of the word Malanad which means the land of hills. According to William Logan, the word Malabar comes from a combination of the Malayalam word Mala (hill) and the Persian/Arabic word Barr (country/continent).

History

Ezhimala kingdom

The ancient port of Naura, which is mentioned in the Periplus of the Erythraean Sea as a port somewhere north of Muziris is identified with Kannur.

Pliny the Elder (1st century CE) states that the port of Tyndis was located at the northwestern border of Keprobotos (Chera dynasty). The North Malabar region, which lies north of the port at Tyndis, was ruled by the kingdom of Ezhimala during Sangam period. According to the Periplus of the Erythraean Sea, a region known as Limyrike began at Naura and Tyndis. However the Ptolemy mentions only Tyndis as the Limyrike'''s starting point. The region probably ended at Kanyakumari; it thus roughly corresponds to the present-day Malabar Coast. The value of Rome's annual trade with the region was estimated at around 50,000,000 sesterces. Pliny the Elder mentioned that Limyrike was  prone by pirates. The Cosmas Indicopleustes mentioned that the Limyrike was a source of peppers.Das, Santosh Kumar (2006). The Economic History of Ancient India. Genesis Publishing Pvt Ltd. p. 301.

The Ezhimala dynasty had jurisdiction over two Nadus - The coastal Poozhinadu and the hilly eastern Karkanadu. According to the works of Sangam literature, Poozhinadu consisted much of the coastal belt between Mangalore and Kozhikode. Karkanadu consisted of Wayanad-Gudalur hilly region with parts of Kodagu (Coorg). It is said that Nannan, the most renowned ruler of Ezhimala dynasty, took refuge at Wayanad hills in the 5th century CE when he was lost to Cheras, just before his execution in a battle, according to the Sangam works. Ezhimala kingdom was succeeded by Mushika dynasty in the early medieval period, most possibly due to the migration of Tuluva Brahmins from Tulu Nadu. The Kolathunadu (Kannur) Kingdom at the peak of its power, reportedly extended from Netravati River (Mangalore) in the north to Korapuzha (Kozhikode) in the south with Arabian Sea on the west and Kodagu hills on the eastern boundary, also including the isolated islands of Lakshadweep in the Arabian Sea.

North Malabar was a hub of Indian Ocean trade during the era. According to Kerala Muslim tradition, the kingdom of Ezhimala was home to several oldest mosques in the Indian subcontinent. According to the Legend of Cheraman Perumals, the first Indian mosque was built in 624 AD at Kodungallur with the mandate of the last the ruler (the Cheraman Perumal) of Chera dynasty, who left from Dharmadom to Mecca and converted to Islam during the lifetime of Prophet Muhammad (c. 570–632). According to Qissat Shakarwati Farmad, the Masjids at Kodungallur, Kollam, Madayi, Barkur, Mangalore, Kasaragod, Kannur, Dharmadam, Panthalayani, and Chaliyam, were built during the era of Malik Dinar, and they are among the oldest Masjids in the Indian subcontinent. It is believed that Malik Dinar died at Thalangara in Kasaragod town. Most of them lies in the erstwhile region of Ezhimala kingdom. The Koyilandy Jumu'ah Mosque contains an Old Malayalam inscription written in a mixture of Vatteluttu and Grantha scripts which dates back to the 10th century CE. It is a rare surviving document recording patronage by a Hindu king (Bhaskara Ravi) to the Muslims of Kerala.

Mushika dynasty

Between the 9th and 12th centuries, a dynasty called "Mushaka" controlled the Chirakkal areas of northern Malabar (the Wynad-Tellichery area was part of the Second Chera Kingdom). The Mushakas were probably the descendants of the ancient royal family of Nannan of Ezhi mala and were perhaps a vassal of the Cheras. The Kolla-desam (or the Mushika-rajya) came under the influence of the Chera/Perumals kingdom during eleventh century AD. The Chola references to several kings in medieval Kerala confirms that the power of the Chera/Perumal was restricted to the country around capital Kodungallur. The Perumal kingship remained nominal compared with the power that local rulers (such as that of the Mushika in the north and Venatu in the south) exercised politically and militarily. Medieval Kolla-desam stretched on the banks of Kavvai, Koppam and Valappattanam rivers. 
An Old Malayalam inscription (Ramanthali inscriptions), dated to 1075 CE, mentioning king Kunda Alupa, the ruler of Alupa dynasty of Mangalore, can be found at Ezhimala (the former headquarters of Mushika dynasty) near Cannanore, Kerala. The Arabic inscription on a copper slab within the Madayi Mosque in Kannur records its foundation year as 1124 CE. In his book on travels (Il Milione), Marco Polo recounts his visit to the area in the mid 1290s. Other visitors included Faxian, the Buddhist pilgrim and Ibn Batuta, writer and historian of Tangiers. The Mushika-vamsha Mahakavya, written by Athula in the 11th century, throws light on the recorded past of the Mushika Royal Family up until that point.

Old Malayalam inscriptions related to Mushika dynasty

Validhara Vikkirama Rama (c. 929 AD) - mentioned in the Ezhimala-Narayankannur inscription.
 Kantan Karivarman alias Iramakuta Muvar  (c. 1020 AD)  - mentioned in an Eramam inscription of Chera/Perumal Bhaskara Ravi Manukuladitya (962–1021 AD).Mushikesvara Chemani/Jayamani (c. 1020 AD) - Tiruvadur inscription.
 Ramakuta Muvar (as a donor to the Tiruvalla temple in Tiruvalla Copper Plates/Huzur Treasury Plates).
 Utaiya-varma alias Ramakuta Muvar (early 12th century AD) - mentioned in the Kannapuram inscription.

Kolathunadu

Kolathunadu (Kingdom of Kannur) was one of the 4 most powerful kingdoms on the Malabar Coast during the arrival of Portuguese Armadas to India, the others being Zamorin, Kingdom of Cochin and Quilon. Kolattunādu had its capital at Ezhimala and was ruled by Kolattiri Royal Family and roughly comprised the North Malabar region of Kerala state in India. Traditionally, Kolattunādu is described as the land lying between Perumba river in the north and Putupattanam river in the south. The ruling house of Kolathunādu, also known as the Kolathiris, were descendants of the Mushaka Royal Family, (which was an ancient dynasty of kerala)and rose to become one of the major political powers in the Kerala region, after the disappearance of the Cheras of Mahodayapuram and the Pandyan Dynasty in the 12th century AD.Perumal of Kerala by M. G. S. Narayanan (Kozhikode: Private Circulation, 1996) The Kolathiris trace their ancestry back to the ancient Mushika kingdom (Ezhimala kingdom, Eli-nadu) of the Tamil Sangam Age. The Indian anthropologist Ayinapalli Aiyappan states that a powerful and warlike clan of the Bunt community of Tulu Nadu was called Kola Bari and the Kolathiri Raja of Kolathunadu was a descendant of this clan.

Until the 16th century CE, Kasargod town was known by the name Kanhirakode (may be by the meaning, 'The land of Kanhira Trees') in Malayalam. The Kumbla dynasty, who swayed over the land of southern Tulu Nadu wedged between Chandragiri River and Netravati River (including present-day Taluks of Manjeshwar and Kasaragod) from Maipady Palace at Kumbla, had also been vassals to  the Kolathunadu, before the Carnatic conquests of Vijayanagara Empire. The Kumbla dynasty had a mixed lineage of Malayali Nairs and Tuluva Brahmins. They also claimed their origin from Cheraman Perumals of Kerala. Francis Buchanan-Hamilton states that the customs of Kumbla dynasty were similar to those of the contemporary Malayali kings, though Kumbla was considered as the southernmost region of Tulu Nadu.

The Zamorin of Calicut, who was actually the ruler of South Malabar and became the most powerful ruler on Malabar Coast, conquerred many regions of North Malabar including Koyilandy (Panthalayini Kollam). By the 15th century CE, Kolathiri Rajas came under the influence of Zamorin just like the other kingdoms of Kerala. The  Kolathiri  Dominion  emerged  into  independent 10 principalities i.e., Kadathanadu (Vadakara), Randathara or Poyanad (Dharmadom), Kottayam (Thalassery), Nileshwaram, Iruvazhinadu (Panoor), Kurumbranad etc.,   under   separate   royal   chieftains   due   to   the   outcome   of   internal dissensions. The Nileshwaram dynasty on the northernmost part of Kolathiri dominion, were relatives to both Kolathunadu as well as Zamorin of Calicut, in the early medieval period. The Portuguese arrived at Kappad Kozhikode in 1498 during the Age of Discovery, thus opening a direct sea route from Europe to South Asia. The St. Angelo Fort at Kannur was built in 1505 by Dom Francisco de Almeida, the first Portuguese Viceroy of India. The Dutch captured the fort from the Portuguese in 1663. They modernized the fort and built the bastions Hollandia, Zeelandia, and Frieslandia that are the major features of the present structure. The original Portuguese fort was pulled down later. A painting of this fort and the fishing ferry behind it can be seen in the Rijksmuseum Amsterdam. The Dutch sold the fort to king Ali Raja of Arakkal in 1772.

During the 17th century, Kannur was the capital city of the only Muslim Sultanate in Kerala, known as Arakkal, who also ruled the Laccadive Islands in addition to Kannur. The island of Dharmadom near Kannur, along with Thalassery, was ceded to the East India Company as early as 1734, which were claimed by all of the Kolattu Rajas, Kottayam Rajas, and  Arakkal Bibi in the late medieval period, where the British initiated a factory and English settlement following the cession.

Colonial era

In 1761, the British captured Mahé, and the settlement was handed over to the ruler of Kadathanadu. The British restored Mahé to the French as a part of the 1763 Treaty of Paris. In 1779, the Anglo-French war broke out, resulting in the French loss of Mahé. In 1783, the British agreed to restore to the French their settlements in India, and Mahé was handed over to the French in 1785.

The northern parts of Kerala was unified under Tipu Sultan during the last decades of eighteenth century CE. When he was defeated by the East India Company through Third Anglo-Mysore War, the Treaty of Seringapatam was agreed and the regions included in Tipu's kingdom was annexed with the East India Company. After the Anglo-Mysore wars, the parts of Malabar Coast, those became British colonies, were organized into a district of British India. They divided it into North Malabar and South Malabar on 30 March 1793 for administrative convenience. Though the general administrative headquarters of Malabar was at Calicut in South Malabar, the special headquarters of South Malabar was decided to be at Cherpulassery, which was then replaced to Ottapalam. South Malabar was the centre of the Malabar Rebellion in 1921. On 1 November 1956, this region was annexed with the Indian state of Kerala.

The East India Company captured the fort Kannur in 1790 and used it as one of their major military stations on the Malabar Coast. Initially the Malabar was placed under Bombay Presidency. Later in 1799-1800 year, Malabar along with South Canara was transferred to Madras Presidency. During the period of British colonial rule, Kannur was part of the Madras province in the Malabar District. The municipalities of Kannur and Thalassery were formed on 1 November 1866 according to the Madras Act 10 of 1865 (Amendment of the Improvements in Towns act 1850) of the British Indian Empire, along with the municipalities of Kozhikode, Palakkad, and Fort Kochi, making them the first modern municipalities in the modern state of Kerala.

Initially the British had to suffer local resistance against their rule under the leadership of Kerala Varma Pazhassi Raja, who had popular support in Thalassery-Wayanad region. The guerrilla war launched by Pazhassi Raja, the ruler of Kottayam province, against the East India Company had a huge impact on the history of Kannur. Changes in the socio-economic and political sectors in Kerala during the initial decades of the 20th century created conditions congenial for the growth of the Communist Party. Extension of English education initiated by Christian missionaries in 1906 and later carried forward by government, rebellion for wearing a cloth to cover upper parts of body, installing an idol at Aruvippuram in 1888, Malayali Memorial in 1891, establishment of SNDP Yogam in 1903, activities, struggles etc. became factors helpful to accelerate changes in Kerala society during a short time. These movements eventually coalesced into the Indian independence movement.

Culture and people

The socio-cultural background and geography of this area has some distinctions compared to the rest of Kerala.Eric J. Miller (1954), Caste and Territory in Malabar, American Anthropological AssociationRavindran Gopinath, 'Garden and Paddy Fields: Historical Implications of Agricultural Production Regimes in Colonial Malabar' in Mushirul Hasan and Narayani Gupta (eds.)M. Jayarajan, Sacred Groves of North Malabar, Discussion Paper No. 92  The population consists of native Hindus, native Mappila-Muslims, native Jains and migrant-Christian communities and is characterized by distinct socio-cultural customs and behavior. The people of North Malabar have striven to preserve their distinct and unique identity and heritage since ancient times, through colonial times into modern political India. From the seventeenth century onward, until the early twentieth century, there were cultural taboos among certain communities from North Malabar, which forbade their women marrying people of the same respective communities, from the southern territories.https://books.google.com/books?hl=de&lr=&id=D27KRLsFNnAC&oi=fnd&pg=PP14&dq=Malabar+and+its+Folk+&ots=EDC3tVAOUl&sig=e6oL4t51asPD4q23Bu2B6CxCtko#v=onepage&q&f=false T.K.G. Panikkar (1900), Malabar and its Folk, AES Reprint 1995 Even in modern times it is not uncommon to see "alliances from Malabar region preferred" in newspaper matrimonial announcements placed by native North Malabar families, irrespective of their ethno-religious background. Traditionally North Malabar has remained the source of an erstwhile aristocracy for many of the southern territories of Kerala through displacement and adoptions including the Travancore Royal Family. Northern Malabar identity and pride is often possessively guarded by its natives of all ethnic and religious backgrounds.

Kottiyoor Utsavam

Kottiyoor Vysakha Mahotsavam is a 27-day yearly pilgrimage commemorating the mythology of Daksha Yaga, which attracts thousands of Hindu pilgrims from the Malabar region.

Social, cultural and historical features

In the pre-democratic era, Marumakkathayam-matriliniality was widely prevalent among the natives of North Malabar and included both the Muslim and Nambudiri communities of Payyanur, in addition to other traditional matrilineal communities such as the Nair and Thiyyas.  Marumakkathayam was also practiced by the Nair, Nambudiri, and Mappila communities in the Ponnani region of South Malabar.The practice of matrilineality was distinctly different and was predominantly virilocal with married couples residing with or near the husband's parents. Unlike other parts of erstwhile matrilineal-Kerala, polyandry was a strict taboo in North Malabar and exceptional customs such as Putravakaasham (purse/estate grants to children of male members) were occasionally allowed.

Landlords in Malabar during colonial and pre-colonial times were the largest landlords of Kerala and during this time political authority remained decentralized in contrast to that of the southern principalities. The royal position of Kolathiri, although immensely respected, was politically titular. In North Malabar, the Kolathiri Kings had the ritualistic status of Perumaal such that their official designates or sthanis retained their jurisdiction all over Kerala except for the Rajarajashwara Temple at Taliparamba.

The major festival observed by Hindus in this region is Vishu rather than Onam, which remains the major celebration for Hindus in the remainder of Kerala. In North Malabar, Vishu is celebrated as New Year.  Because, the Kollavarsham month Medam - which is parallel to first Tamil month Chithirai - is the first month of the year for natives of North Malabar. The Vishu festival is spread over two days and comprises the Cheriya or small Vishu and the Valiya, or main Vishu. Unlike in the rest of Kerala it is not uncommon to see Hindu natives of this region cook and eat non-vegetarian food during their festivals including Vishu and Onam and sometimes even in marriage households.

People from all religions participate in major festivals at temples, mosques and churches.  Some examples include: Nadapuram Mosque, Mahe Church, Moonnu Pettumma Palli Pappinisseri and Theyyam ritual art.

Unlike Travancore, but like in rest of Malabar and Cochin, natives of North Malabar mix coconut paste with sambar, the most common dish of South India.Malabar Sambar recipe – All recipes India

North Malabar cuisine is noted for its variety of dishes including chutneys, pancakes, steamed cakes and various dishes such as kalathappam,  kinnathappam, uruttu chammanthi, poduthol, pathiri, chatti pathiri and  moodakadamban. Bakery-cuisine is well developed in the area and has led to large numbers of natives operating popular bakeries in Chennai, Bangalore, Mumbai, Coimbatore, Mysore, Pune and Southern Kerala.

People from this area are characterized by a stronger sense of socio-political aspirations often leading to large outbreaks of political violence.

Textiles, beedi, hand-weaving, plywood and coir represent important industries while cashew, cinnamon (North Malabar is home to Asia's largest cinnamon farm) and pepper are important cash crops.

North Malabar represents one of the earliest and largest pockets of exposure to other cultures in Kerala through Chalukyas, Hoysalas, Tuluvas, Rashtrakutas, Kodavas, Tulus, Arabs, Persians, Portuguese, Dutch, French, British, and through early employment and migrations in government and military services from the time of its incorporation into the Madras Presidency. Nevertheless, its people are conservatively possessive of its identity preferring a "geographical endogamy" culture.

Calendar system
The version of the Malayalam calendar or Kollavarsham  used in central and south Kerala begins on August25, 825 AD. The year commences with Simha-raasi  (Leo) and not in Mesha-raasi (Aries) as in other Indian calendars. However, in North Malabar and Kolathunadu the start of the Kollam era is reckoned from the month of Kanya-rasi (Virgo), which begins on 25 September. This variation has two accounts associated with it.Kerolopathi, a traditional text dealing with the origins of Malabar, attributes the introduction of the Kollam era to Shankaracharya. Translation of the phrase Aa chaa rya vaa ga bhed ya (meaning Shankaracharya's word/law is unalterable) into numbers in the Katapayadi notation produces 0 6 1 4 3 4 1 and these written backwards give the age of the Kali Yuga in the first year of the Kollam era. Kali, day 1,434,160, would work out to be September25, 825 AD, which corresponds to the beginning of the Kollam era in North Malabar, i.e. the first day of the month of Kanya-raasi (Virgo) .

Dialects
There are several dialects of the Malayalam language prevalent in North Malabar. Loan words, excluding the significant number of words from Sanskrit, originated mostly due to centuries long interactions between the native population of North Malabar and the horse and spice traders of the world. These included trading contacts with Arabia, Persia, Israel, China and European colonial powers for several centuries. Examples of these dialects include Kasaragod Malayalam and Mappila Malayalam. However, the majority of the young-adult Keralites from other provinces who are ignorant of the rich melting-pot culture of Malabar dialects are uncomfortable with these forms of Malayalam.

Historic immigrations into North Malabar
Tulu Brahmin immigration

In 1617, the Kolathiri Raja Udayavarman, wished to attain the higher status of kshatriya by undergoing the Hiranyagarbham ritual in honour of Hiranyagarbha, the creator of the universe. Since the Nambudiri Brahmins were not prepared for the ceremony, Udayavarman brought 237 families of Shivalli Brahmins from Gokarna in Coastal Karnataka and settled them in the five counties of Cheruthazham, Kunniriyam, Arathil, Kulappuram and Vararuchimangalam in North Malabar. The Sree Raghavapuram temple (Hanuman Kavu) at Pilathara was assigned to the 237 families for worship, and it became their village temple. The 93 Edukunchi families displaced as a result received the hereditary trusteeship of the Sreekrishnapuram temple in Cheruthazham, 62 Gunavantham families that of Arathil Sreebhadrapuram temple and the 82 Vilakkoor families that of Udayapurath Haripuram temple. These 237 families adopted the customs of local Nambudiri Brahmins and came to be referred to as Embranthiris.

Nasrani Migration

The Malabar Migration refers to the large-scale migration of Syrian Christians (Nasranis) from the Travancore region to the Malabar area of northern Kerala in the 20th century. The migration started in the decades of the 20th century and continued well into the 1970s and 1980s.

Central Travancore had experienced a steep increase in population in the early 20th century while pressure on arable land increased. At the same time, people recognised the potential of the large uncultivated lands in the northern regions called Malabar, which was then part of the Madras Presidency under British Rule. Migration initially started in trickles with land bought from the local rulers. Huge tracts of uncultivated forest and waste land were later converted into farms and plantations. Against the odds, the community thrived, which attracted more migrants. This migration reached its peak in the 1950s.

These migrants came mostly from present day Kottayam, Idukki, Muvattupuzha and Kothamangalam with migrations happening across the entire Malabar region (north Kerala) including into the following districts of present-day Kerala (some key migration centres are also mentioned):
Kasaragod -Malom, Kallar, Chittarikkal, Vellarikundu, Panathady, Panathur
Kannur - Alakkode, Chemperi, Cherupuzha, Kudianmala, Iritty, Peravoor, Payyavoor, Chempanthotty
Calicut - Thiruvambady, Kuttiady
Malapuram - Nilambur, Edakkara, Chungathara
Wayanad - Pulpally

The Syro-Malabar Catholic Church gave significant support to the migration by providing churches, discipline, schools, hospitals and other infrastructure.

Overall, hundreds of thousands of people moved to North Kerala. The percentage of Christian residents in these districts was small before the migration but since 1950 this settler community has formed a significant part of the population in the hill areas of these districts.

Immigration of Knanaya Christians

Historically, the North Malabar landlords were the largest land-holders in Kerala, but the introduction of the Kerala Land Reforms Bill in 1957 resulted in their panic selling of farm and forest land. This was followed by immigration of Christians from Knanaya into the North Malabar Region in search of virgin land to cultivate and to seek relief from the poverty and financial strain caused by the Second World War. Under the direction of Prof. V.J. Joseph Kandoth and Bishop Mar Alexander Chulaparambil,Kumbattu Varkey Joseph, Migration and economic development of Kerala the Diocese of Kottayam bought  of land in the Kasargod area in 1942. The new venture was announced in all the parishes of southern Kerala. Applications were invited and each family was allotted  of land 1943. The emigrants from all southern Kerala parishes reached Cochin by boat and from there travelled by train to Shornur and Kanhangad. A team of priests, especially of the O.S.H. Society and laymen were sent ahead to prepare the ground and to receive them on their arrival. The name of the local area was changed from Echikkol to Rajapuram. In the same way, the diocese organized another settlement at Madampam near Kannur. The Diocese bought  of land and 100 families migrated to the new area on 3 May 1943. The settlement was called Alexnagar after Bishop Mar Alexander Chulaparambil. Madathumala in Kasargod District at its eastern border with the Karnataka state was the venue of a third settlement of 45 families. The land was purchased on 26September 1969 and the Ranipuram settlement inaugurated on 2February 1970 dedicated to the Virgin Mary. Although there were initial difficulties due to wild animals, Ranipuram gradually prospered and today there is also a Government tourist center at Ranipuram. The Diocese of Kottayam made also arrangements with the Latin Ordinaries to have pastoral ministry and liturgical celebrations according to their own Syro-Malabar Rite. Presently, one third of the Knanaya Catholic population is in the Malabar area.

In addition, taking advantage of the selling spree of landlords of Malabar in general and more particularly the larger landlords of North Malabar, several other Travancore Christian families immigrated into Malabar to pursue agriculture. These migrations peaked during 1960–71.

Immigration of teachers
The number of large land owning private-Tharavad-owned schools in North Malabar expanded in the first half of the twentieth century partly due to the availability of government grant-in-aid for such enterprises from 1939 onwards.  Furthermore, corporate expansion of land owning Tharavads and a decrease in European engineered proletysing of the depressed classes also contributed to the growth pattern. These schools often had teaching staff from educated families. In democratic Kerala however, many of these schools evolved as public and government enterprises, which led to the recruitment of teachers from the southern provinces and the subsequent immigration of teaching staff of all ethno-religious backgrounds, many of whom preferred to settle in the area permanently.

Historic emigrations to Southern Kerala
Historically significant emigration from North Malabar occurred in three phases.

Dispersement of the erstwhile ruling elite
From 1766 to 1792, during the era of Hyder Ali and Tipu Sultan, multiple military invasions, plunder and systematic forcible religious conversions took place in both North and South Malabar.Voyage to East Indies by Fra Bartolomaeo (Portuguese Traveller and Historian)A Journey from Madras through the counties of Mysore, Canara and Malabar by Dr. Francis Buchanan Hamilton, Vol. II.Selected Letters of Tipu Sultan to various Functionaries by William Kirkpatrick, published in London, 1811.History of Cochin State by K.P. Padmanabha Menon, Mathrubhumi Publication, 1989.State Manual of Travancore by T.K. Velu Pillai.Sakthan Thampuran by P. Raman Menon, Mathrubhoomi Publication, 1989.Chronicles and Reports originating from Trippunithura, Calicut, Palghat and other seats of Kerala Royal families and from Temples of Trichur and Carmichael Christian Mission, Varappuzha.Malabar Kalapam of 1921 by K. Madhavan Nair.Tipu Sultan X-rayed by Dr. I.M. Muthanna, Usha Press, Mysore 1980.Zamorins in Kerala by K.V. Krishna Iyer. Fearing forcible conversion, a significant number of Nair Chieftains and Brahmins from Malabar chose to take refuge in the erstwhile Kingdom of Travancore, as under the Treaty of Mangalore Travancore had an alliance with the English East India Company according to which "aggression against Travancore would be viewed as equivalent to declaration of war against the English". Thus at various times between 1766 and 1792, all female members and many male members of the different royal families of North and South Malabar: Chirackal, Parappanad, and Calicut, and chieftains' families: Punnathoor, Nilambur, Kavalapara and Azhvanchery Thamprakkal (titular head of all Namboothiri Brahmins), sought asylum in Travancore and temporarily settled in different parts of the kingdom. Even after the fall of Tipu Sultan's regime in Srirangapatnam, some of the Malabar nobility, wholly or partly, preferred to remain in Travancore because of fear of atrocities if they returned home. The 17 prominent aristocratic lineages of southern Kerala that claim their origin from Malabar through displacement during this period are: 
Neerazhi Kovilakam
Gramathil Kottaram
Paliyakkara
Nedumparampu
Chempra Madham
Ananthapuram Kottaram
Ezhimatoor Palace
Aranmula Kottaram
Varanathu Kovilakam
Mavelikkara
Ennakkadu 
Murikkoyikkal Palace
Mariappilly
Koratti Swaroopam
Kaippuzha Kovilakam
Lakshmipuram Palace
Kottapuram.

Adoptions by the erstwhile ruling elite
The Kolathiris were a family descended from the Cheras and the Ay/Venad/Travancore Royal Family, that originated in the Thiruvananthapuram area, and settled in the Kannur region centuries ago. They had been a constant source of heirs for the Travancore royal family (and this practice of adoption was also reciprocal) by permitting some of its matrilineal branches of members to make settlements in Thiruvananthapuram and be adopted. The first adoption took place around 1310 whereby the two princesses of the Kolathiri family were installed as Senior and Junior Rānis of Attingal, with the titles of Āttingal Mootha Thampurān and Āttingal Elaya Thampurān respectively. Adoptions into the Travancore Royal Family followed in 1684, 1688, 1718, 1748 and 1788 until the 19th century. The celebrated Mārthanda Varma the Great was a result of the 1688 adoption and his successor Dharmarājā, who fought and defeated Tipu Sultan of Mysore, was the result of the 1718 adoption. The weak Balarama Varma who ruled after Dharmarājā in the early 19th century belonged to the 1748 line. The noted Maharanis Gowri Lakshmi Bayi and Gowri Parvati Bayi belonged to the 1788 line as did the Maharajahs Swāthi Thirunāl, Uthram Thirunāl, Āyilyam Thirunāl, Visākham Thirunāl and Moolam Thirunāl.

Economic migration in democratic India
In 1956, the State of Kerala was formed along linguistic lines, merging the Travancore, Cochin and Malabar regions. The first Kerala Legislative Assembly was formed on 1March 1957 and the following 50 years saw migration of lawyers, politicians, businessmen and government officials from North Malabar to the southern cities of Kerala especially Cochin and Trivandrum. However many of these families still retain their links to their native area through marriage association, partial retention of natal property and often a characteristic sacerdotal North Malabar self-identity.

Folk art
North Malabar has a rich history of folk-art, culture and tradition. The government of Kerala has encouraged promotion of these through the Kerala Folklore Academy at Kannur. Among the notable examples are:

Theyyam 

Theyyam, an ancient ritual performance art of the region in which a man is dressed symbolically as god. In the Kadathanadan area, it is known as kaliyattam. There are around 400 types of Theyyam, which are conducted on a stage and use elaborate costumes and body-painting. Each type has a distinguishing head-dress and costume made from natural materials, such as coconut leaves and bark. Musical accompaniments are provided by the chenda, elathalam and kuzhal (horn).

Thottam Pattu
Thottam Pattu is ballad sung just before performance of the Theyyam ritual.

Kalaripayattu
Kalaripayattu is a martial art that originated in North Malabar and was developed between the 9th and 12th centuries.

Vadakkan Pattukal
The Vadakkan Pattukal are ballads that extol the adventures of the brave men and women of North Malabar. Set against a feudal medieval background, the stories celebrate the valour and skills of their characters. The ballads reflect the peak of Kerala folk-poetry and are associated with Kadathanadu. The movie Oru Vadakkan Veeragatha capitalised on the popularity of these stories.

Thidambu Nritham
Thidambu Nritham (dance with the replica of the deity) is a ritual dance performed in temples. It is mainly performed by Nambudiri Brahmins and occasionally by other Brahmin communities.

Poorakkali
Poorakkali is a traditional art form performed by a group of men who dance and chant holy verses from the Ramayana or Bhagavata. It is performed during the nine-day Pooram festival in Bhagavathy temples.  Payyannur, Trikaripur and nearby places like Vengara, Ramanthali, Karivellur, are well known for this art form.

Kolkali
Kolkali is an art form involving both men and women which is also seen in South Malabar too. It is the only folk art that is performed by both Hindus and Muslims, although there are slight differences in how the two do it. Muslims perform it as a form of entertainment during social gatherings and marriages, whereas the Hindus perform it at temple festivals. It involves rapid limb movements and simultaneous chanting of folksong, with the performers moving in pairs, hitting their batons (koles) against each other in a methodical way in tune with folksongs. It is played according to Vaithari or Thalam by the Gurukkal (Teacher).

The typical Kolkali group will contain between sixteen and twenty members. One among them will sing the folksong and it will be chorused by rest.  Harmonizing with generational changes, Kolkali like all other folk-art of North Malabar, has also changed its look and style over time. The noted Kolkali groups are found in the Kasaragod District.

Mappila (Muslim) folklore
Mappila folklore has deep roots in the region.  The major Mappila arts of Malabar region (both North and South Malabar) are :

 Oppana 
 Duff Muttu 
 Mappila Paattu

Malabar Cuisine

The Malabar cuisine depicts it culture and heritage. Malabar cuisine is a blend of traditional Kerala, Persian, Yemenese and Arab food culture. This confluence of culinary cultures is best seen in the preparation of most dishes. Kallummakkaya (mussels) curry, irachi puttu (irachi meaning meat), parottas (soft flatbread), Pathiri (a type of rice pancake) and ghee rice are some of the other specialties. The characteristic use of spices is the hallmark of North Malabar cuisine—black pepper, cardamom and clove are used profusely.

The Malabar version of biryani, popularly known as kuzhi mandi in Malayalam is another popular item, which has an influence from Yemen. Various varieties of biriyanis like Thalassery biriyani, and Kannur biriyani, are prepared in North Malabar.

The snacks include unnakkaya (deep-fried, boiled ripe banana paste covering a mixture of cashew, raisins and sugar), pazham nirachathu (ripe banana filled with coconut grating, molasses or sugar), muttamala made of eggs, chatti pathiri, a dessert made of flour, like a baked, layered chapati with rich filling, arikkadukka, and more.

However, the newer generation is more inclined towards to Chinese and American food. Chinese food is very popular among the locals.

Notable individuals

 Kerala Varma Pazhassi (c. 1753 - c. 1805) popularly known as the Lion of Kerala, he was a prince from the royal dynasty of Kottayam (Malabar) which now belongs to the Kannur District of Kerala State. He waged war against Mysore and the British for 27 years.
 K. Kelappan - was the founder President of the Nair Service Society who later became the principal of a school run by the society. He fought for social reforms on the one hand and against the British on the other. He was a great revolutionary, social reformer and crusader for justice to the backward classes. He was called Kerala Gandhi.
 P. T. Usha- The first Indian sprinter to reach the Olympics. Winner of several gold medals in the Asian Games.
 Lt Gen Satish Nambiar- recipient of a Vir Chakra and Force Commander of UNPROFOR.
 E. K. Nayanar  - (December 1918 - May 2004) born in Kalliasseri, Kannur was a prominent Indian political leader of the Communist Party of India (Marxist). He held the post of Chief Minister of Kerala three times. He was the longest-serving Chief Minister of Kerala, serving a total of 4009 days.
 K. Karunakaran - (July 1918 - December 2010) was an Indian politician from Chirakkal in the Kannur District. He held the post of Chief Minister of Kerala four times, making him the person who became the Chief Minister for the most number of times, and was also the second longest-serving Chief Minister of Kerala after Nayanar.
 Pinarayi Vijayan - veteran Communist leader, former State secretary of Communist Party of India (Marxist) and current Chief Minister of Kerala.
 Vijay K. Nambiar - Former ambassador to China and Pakistan and former Chef de Cabinet (Chief of Staff) under UN Secretary-General Ban Ki-Moon.
 Gireesh Puthenchery - Well known lyricist and screenwriter in the Malayalam film industry.
 T. V. Chandran - Well known director in the Malayalam film industry.
 Mavila Vishwanathan Nair - Banker.
 Vineeth - born on 23August 1969, a South Indian film actor and classical dancer.
 M. N. Nambiar - (1919—2008) film actor in Tamil cinema who spent more than 50 years in the film industry.
 Vengayil Kunhiraman Nayanar - (1861–1914) was a Malayali journalist, essay writer, critic and short story writer born into the chieftain family of "Vengayil", Chirakkal Taluk and was a close friend of Dr. Hermann Gundert and William Logan, researchers on the history, language, culture of Kerala.
 Kannavath Sankaran Nambiar - Minister of Pazhassi Raja who was active in resistance to Mysorean and British invaders.
 Sreenivasan - Noted Malayalam actor and director.
 Samvrutha Sunil - Noted Malayalam film heroine.
 Kavya Madhavan - Popular Malayalam film actress.
 O. M. Nambiar - Renowned as an Indian athletics coach.
 M Kunjikannan - Kunjikannan Master, journalist, Gandhian, educational and social activist.
 Kodiyeri Balakrishnan - Home Minister in the V.S. Achuthanandan ministry from 2006 to 2011, and current State secretary of Communist Party of India (Marxist).
 Kanayi Kunhiraman - Sculptor.
 M. Mukundan - Novelist and diplomat.
 K. Raghavan - Veteran Malayalam music director.
 Abu Salim (actor) - Popular film actor and Mr India Title winner in 1984 and 1992.
 C. P. Krishnan Nair - Internationally known businessman from the Leela Group of Hotels.
 Sanusha - Noted film actress.
 Anaswara Rajan - Noted film actress.
 Maliyekkal Mariyumma - Social reformer

See also
 Malabar pepper
 Kolathiri
 South Malabar
 North Malabar Gramin Bank

References

 Further reading 
General
  (The English translation of Tuhfat Ul Mujahideen'')

Kasaragod region
 
 
 
 
 

Regions of Kerala
Malabar Coast